Berlevåg Church is a parish church of the Church of Norway in Berlevåg municipality in Troms og Finnmark county, Norway. It is located in the village of Berlevåg. It is the church for the Berlevåg parish which is part of the Varanger prosti (deanery) in the Diocese of Nord-Hålogaland. The white, concrete church was built in a long church style in 1960 by the architect Hans Magnus. The church seats about 300 people.

History 
Historically, the Berlevåg area was part of the Tana Church parish, meaning that residents had to travel to Rustefjelbma which was a long, arduous journey. In 1869, a small annex chapel was built in Berlevåg that was used by the local residents. In 1885-1886, the old chapel was torn down and a new church was built on the same site. The new church was consecrated on 9 September 1886. By the 1930s, the church was in need of repair and upgrades, so an extensive renovation was begun in July 1939. After  in work was completed, the church was re-consecrated on 7 April 1940 by the Bishop Wollert Krohn-Hansen.

Towards the end of World War II, the retreating German army burned down the newly refurbished church in 1944. After the end of the war, it took a long time to rebuild all that had been destroyed in Finnmark during the war. Work on the new Berlevåg Church was completed in 1960. On 11 December 1960, Bishop Alf Wiig consecrated the new church building.

Berlevåg Church was part of the Tana prestegjeld until 1982, when the municipality became a separate prestegjeld.

Media gallery

See also
List of churches in Nord-Hålogaland

References

External links 

Berlevåg
Churches in Finnmark
Long churches in Norway
Concrete churches in Norway
20th-century Church of Norway church buildings
Churches completed in 1960
1869 establishments in Norway